The 2022–23 Texas A&M–Commerce Lions men's basketball team represented the Texas A&M University–Commerce in the 2022–23 NCAA Division I men's basketball season. The Lions, led by fifth-year head coach Jaret von Rosenberg, played their home games at Texas A&M–Commerce Field House in Commerce, Texas, as members of the Southland Conference.

This season marks Texas A&M–Commerce's first year of a four-year transition period from Division II to Division I. As a result, the Lions will not be eligible for NCAA postseason play until the 2026–27 season.

Previous season
The Texas A&M-Commerce Lions finished the 2021–22 NCAA Division II men's basketball season 17–9, 9–5 in Lone Star Conference play to finish in fourth place in conference. The Lions were defeated by Texas A&M–Kingsville in the first round of the 2022 Lone Star Conference men's basketball tournament.  They were invited to the 2022 NCAA Division II men's basketball tournament.  Their season ended in the tournament's South Central Regional first round with a defeat to number 1 seeded Lubbock Christian University.

Preseason polls

Southland Conference Poll
The Southland Conference released its preseason poll on October 25, 2022. Receiving 56 votes overall, the Lions were picked to finish seventh in the conference.

Preseason All Conference
No Lions were selected as members of a Preseason all conference team.

Roster 
Sources:

Schedule and results

|-
!colspan=12 style=| Exhibition season

|-
!colspan=12 style=| Non-conference season

|-
!colspan=12 style=| Southland Conference season

|-
!colspan=12 style=| Southland Tournament

Source:

See also
2022–23 Texas A&M–Commerce Lions women's basketball team

References

Texas A&M–Commerce Lions men's basketball seasons
Texas AandM-Commerce Lions
Texas AandM-Commerce Lions men's basketball
Texas AandM-Commerce Lions men's basketball